The British Academy Television Craft Awards of 2009 are presented by the British Academy of Film and Television Arts (BAFTA) and were held on 17 May 2009 at Hilton Hotel, Mayfair, the ceremony was hosted by Alexander Armstrong.

Winners and nominees
Winners will be listed first and highlighted in boldface.

Special awards
 Aardman Animations

See also
 2009 British Academy Television Awards

References

External links
British Academy Craft Awards official website

2009 television awards
2009 in British television
2009 in London
May 2009 events in the United Kingdom
2009